Over the Garden Wall is a 1950 British comedy film directed by John E. Blakeley and starring Norman Evans, Jimmy James and Dan Young. The film was made at Mancunian Films at their Dickenson Road Studios in Manchester. Although made on a low-budget, the film often topped double bills at cinemas in the North of England because of the popularity of the performers.

Plot
Working class couple Fanny and Joe (Norman Evans and Jimmy James), are determined to give their daughter Mary (Sonya O'Shea) and her husband a posh home coming party. Trouble arises when the son of Joe's boss (Frederick Bradshaw) turns up and shamelessly flirts with their daughter.

Cast
 Norman Evans as Fanny Lawton  
 Jimmy James as Joe Lawton 
 Dan Young as Dan  
 Alec Pleon as Alec  
 Sonya O'Shea as Mary Harrison  
 Frederick Bradshaw as Ken Smith 
 Agnes Bernelle as Val Westwood  
 Neville Brook as Mr. Smith  
 John Wynn as Tony Harrison
 Patrick Baring 
 Billy Howard 
 Langley Howard 
 Eli Woods as Eli

Legacy
Despite its popularity, Over the Garden Wall was poorly regarded at the time by the National Film Finance Corporation (NFFC), who decided to withdraw financial support from Mancunian Films. The NFFC chairman, Lord Reith, expressed dissatisfaction with the quality of Mancunian's comedy productions; of Over the Garden Wall  (1950), Reith said it was not "of as high a quality as the Corporation would have wished".

Norman Evans' appearance in drag as Fanny Lawton was an influential performance in the history of female impersonation on-screen, and his character later inspired the comedian Les Dawson with his comedy drag act as Cissy Braithwaite.

References

Bibliography
 Chibnall, Steve & McFarlane, Brian. The British 'B' Film. Palgrave MacMillan, 2009.

External links

1950 films
1950 comedy films
1950s English-language films
1950s British films
British comedy films
British black-and-white films
Films directed by John E. Blakeley
Films set in Manchester
Films shot in Greater Manchester